The Acquisition of Land Act 1981 (c 67) is an Act of Parliament of the United Kingdom, which concerns English land law and compulsory purchase.

Contents
The Act regulates the conditions for granting a "Compulsory Purchase Order" in the UK.

See also

English land law
Compulsory purchase
Re Ellenborough Park [1955] EWCA Civ 4, [1956] Ch 131

Notes

References
K Gray and SF Gray, Land Law (7th edn 2011) Ch 11
K Gray and S Gray, ‘Private Property and Public Propriety’, in J McLean (ed), Property and the Constitution (Hart 1999) 36-7

United Kingdom Acts of Parliament 1981